Orla Schartau Hyllested (4 August 1912 – 6 September 2000) was a Danish union representative, politician and mayor of Aarhus. Hyllested grew up in Aarhus in a working-class family and was a trained mason. Through his work he became involved in union work and later politics. He served as the mayor of Aarhus for 10 years between 1971 and 1981 for the Danish Social Democratic Party.

Political career 
From a young age Hyllested had to work to supplement the income in his family by delivering milk and later as the assistant in a barber shop. In his adult life he was trained as a mason and worked as such for a few years before he became involved in union work. Between 1935 and 1961 he was member of the board of the Aarhus Mason's Union (Murersvendenes Fagforening), from 1942 to 1946 he sat on the board of Faglig Ungdom and from 1945 he served on the board of the Arbejderens Fællesorganisation. In 1944 he became manager Fagorganisationernes Boligselskab and from 1954 he was hired permanently there as he had to give up the physically demanding mason job. In 1958 he was elected to the Aarhus City Council for the Social Democratic Party. In 1970 he became Councillor for social affairs and deputy mayor during the tenure of mayor Bernhardt Jensen. When Bernhard Jensen resigned his post in 1971 Orla Hyllested became mayor in his stead and remained on that post for 10 years.

In 1981, Aarhus suffered from unemployment and the aftermath of the 1979 energy crisis, and Hyllested decided not to run for mayor again. However, an anonymous person signed him up as an independent in an effort to split the Social Democratic vote. Orla Hyllested was forced to run newspaper ads asking people to vote for the Social Democratic Party.

Public office 

 1957–1959 – Member of the school commission 
 1957–1959 – Member of the boards of Vorrevang, Læssøesgade and Christiansgade Schools
 1958–1970 – Member of the technical committee
 1958–2000 – Member of the board of Andelsselskabet Gudenåcentralen
 1958–1959 – Member of the housing commission 
 1962–2000 – Member of the housing commission 
 1958–1962 – Member of the committee for cultural affairs
 1958–1966 – Member of the housing assignment committee
 1959–2000 – Member of the construction council 
 1959–1959 – Member of the Aarhus County school council
 1959–1962 – Member of the board of Aarhus Natural History Museum
 1962–1970 – Member of the economy committee
 1962–2000 – Member of the vacation funds commission 
 1962–2000 – Member of the Dispositionsplan commission 
 1962–2000 – Member of the Aarhus County commission for intersections
 1962–2000 – Representative for Jydsk Byplanråd
 1962–2000 – Representative for Århus Renholdningsselskabet
 1962–2000 – Representative for I/S Midtkraft
 1962–2000 – Member of the Egnsplan commission 
 1962–2000 – Representative for Idrætsparken 
 1966–2000 – Member of the board of Aarhus Technical School
 1966–2000 – Member of the board of Århusegnens Flyveplads
 1966–2000 – Member of the harbor commission

References

1912 births
2000 deaths
Mayors of places in Denmark
People from Aarhus
Social Democrats (Denmark) politicians